was a Japanese actor with a career spanning five decades. He is best known in the West for his role in the 1967 James Bond film You Only Live Twice as Tiger Tanaka.

Biography
Tamba had a part-time job as an interpreter at Supreme Commander for the Allied Powers before becoming an actor. In 1948, he graduated from Chuo University. In 1951, he joined the Shintoho company and made his screen debut with Satsujinyogisha.

Tamba was introduced to Western audiences in the 1961 film Bridge to the Sun directed by Etienne Périer. He also appeared in the 1964 film The 7th Dawn, directed by Lewis Gilbert. Tamba is perhaps best known by Western audiences for his role as Tiger Tanaka in the 1967 James Bond film You Only Live Twice, also directed by Gilbert (Tamba's voice was dubbed by Robert Rietti). By then, he had among other roles appeared in two films by director Masaki Kobayashi: Harakiri and Kwaidan. He also portrayed the lead character in the police dramas Key Hunter and G-Men '75, the latter of which remains his best-known role in Japan. In 1981, he won the Best Actor in a Supporting Role award of Japan Academy Prize for his work in The Battle of Port Arthur.

Tamba appeared in a lot of jidaigeki television dramas. His major historical roles were Imai Sōkyū in the 1978 taiga drama Ōgon no Hibi and Sanada Masayuki in the 1985 Sanada Taiheiki.

He voiced the "Cat King" in the original Japanese version of the Studio Ghibli anime film The Cat Returns. He had parts in Twilight Samurai and two Takashi Miike films, The Happiness of the Katakuris and Gozu, as well as acting as a spokesperson for the Dai Rei Kai spiritual movement.

Tamba's son, Yoshitaka Tamba, is also an actor.

In February 2005, Tamba was hospitalized for influenza and appendicitis.  He lost weight drastically and his health degenerated.  On September 24, 2006, he died in Tokyo at the age of 84 of pneumonia. His last appearance in the television series is the 2005 Taiga drama Yoshitsune and his last film appearance is Sinking of Japan in 2006.

Selected filmography

Films

TV dramas

Animation
Crayon Shin-chan: Explosion! The Hot Spring's Feel Good Final Battle (1999)
The Cat Returns (2002)

Awards and nominations

Awards
1974: Mainichi Film Award: Best Actor for The Human Revolution
1981: Blue Ribbon Awards: Best Supporting Actor for The Battle of Port Arthur
1981: Japan Academy Prize: Best Supporting Actor for The Battle of Port Arthur
2000: Nikkan Sports Film Award: Best Supporting Actor for 15-Sai: Gakko IV

Awards nominated
2001: Japan Academy Prize: Best Supporting Actor for 15-Sai: Gakko IV

References

External links

Japanese Wikipedia page (also source)
BBC article, retrieved December 10, 2006.
 
 Tesuro Tamba on NHK

1922 births
2006 deaths
Deaths from pneumonia in Japan
Japanese male film actors
Male Spaghetti Western actors
Male actors from Tokyo